Strathfield, an electoral district of the Legislative Assembly in the Australian state of New South Wales, was first established in 1988, largely replacing Burwood.


Members for Strathfield

Election results

Elections in the 2020s

2022 by-election

Elections in the 2010s

2019

2015

2011

Elections in the 2000s

2007

2003

Elections in the 1990s

1999

1996 by-election

1995

1991

Elections in the 1980s

1988

References

New South Wales state electoral results by district